Maryland's Legislative District 1 is one of 47 districts in the state for the Maryland General Assembly. It covers Allegany County, Garrett County and part of Washington County. The district is divided into three sub-districts for the Maryland House of Delegates: District 1A, District 1B and District 1C.

Demographic characteristics
As of the 2020 United States census, the district had a population of 115,613, of whom 94,137 (81.4%) were of voting age. The racial makeup of the district was 102,833 (88.9%) White, 6,001 (5.2%) African American, 214 (0.2%) Native American, 1,041 (0.9%) Asian, 23 (0.0%) Pacific Islander, 812 (0.7%) from some other race, and 4,673 (4.0%) from two or more races. Hispanic or Latino of any race were 1,974 (1.7%) of the population.

The district had 76,701 registered voters as of October 17, 2020, of whom 12,611 (16.4%) were registered as unaffiliated, 43,241 (56.4%) were registered as Republicans, 19,686 (25.7%) were registered as Democrats, and 1,163 (1.5%) were registered to other parties.

Political representation
The district is represented for the 2023–2027 legislative term in the State Senate by Michael W. McKay (R) and in the House of Delegates by James C. Hinebaugh Jr. (R, District 1A, Garrett County and part of Allegany County), Jason C. Buckel (R, District 1B, part of Allegany County) and Terry L. Baker (R, District 1C, parts of Allegany and Washington Counties).

Election history

Election results, 1986-present

Senate

See also
 Maryland House of Delegates District 1A
 Maryland House of Delegates District 1B
 Maryland House of Delegates District 1C

References

Allegany County, Maryland
Garrett County, Maryland
Washington County, Maryland
01